Rapid City Christian School is a private Christian middle school and high school in Rapid City, South Dakota. It was founded in 1981.

Student body
RCCS serves grades 6-12. 2006/2007 was the first school year for 6th grade students at this school.
In 2007–2008, they had 75 students, by 2008-2009  there were 93 students in attendance.

Move to Hart Ranch
Until the end of the 2007 school year, Rapid City Christian was based out of Bible Fellowship Church. 

At the end of the 2007 school year, RCCS moved to a new location at Hart Ranch in the location of the former horse arena, and changed its name to Rapid City Christian School.  For that year, the building was shared with National American University.  In 2008–2009, Rapid City Christian took control of the entire building, but they did not expand into that space immediately.

References

External links

Christian schools in South Dakota
Private high schools in South Dakota
Education in Rapid City, South Dakota
Schools in Pennington County, South Dakota
Private middle schools in South Dakota
Buildings and structures in Rapid City, South Dakota
Educational institutions established in 1981
1981 establishments in South Dakota